Bad Wound is an unincorporated community in Bennett County, in the U.S. state of South Dakota.

Bad Wound was the name of an Oglala Lakota chief.

References

Unincorporated communities in Bennett County, South Dakota
Unincorporated communities in South Dakota